Bill Hufnagle, who writes and performs as Biker Billy, is an American motorcyclist, cookbook author and television personality.

Life and career
Originally from The Bronx, he resides (or has resided) in Asheville, North Carolina; and Madison, New Jersey.

He was food editor for Cruising Rider magazine, and has been featured in Entertainment Weekly, Vanity Fair and Vegetarian Times. He has also appeared on television as a guest on The Tonight Show with Jay Leno, Good Morning America and CNN. He has been  sponsored by Harley-Davidson to exhibit at Daytona Bike Week, and has been a featured exhibitor at other local motorcycle rallies.

He hosted a syndicated public-access cable television show, Biker Billy Cooks With Fire, for six years; the show was featured in Guggenheim Museum's 100 Years of Motorcycle in Film companion to The Art of the Motorcycle exhibition.

A variety of jalapeño pepper was named for him by the Burpee Seed Company.

Hufnagle is a vegetarian.

Awards
National Coalition of Motorcyclists 1998 Media Award (Harvard Press)
American Motorcyclist Association 1999 Most Valued Person award(Harvard Press)

Bibliography

References

External links

American cookbook writers
American male non-fiction writers
American public access television personalities
Motorcycling mass media people
Living people
Year of birth missing (living people)